The Ayere–Ahan languages are a pair of languages of southwestern Nigeria, Ayere and Àhàn (or Ahaan), that form an independent branch of the Volta–Niger languages. These languages are spoken in the border region of Kogi State and Ondo State, Nigeria.

The ASJP 4.0 classifies the Ayere–Ahan languages as most closely related to the Yoruboid languages.

Names and locations
Below is a list of Ayere–Ahan language names and locations from Blench (2019).

See also
Ayere-Ahan word lists (Wiktionary)

References 

Blench, Roger. 2007. The Ayere and Ahan languages of Central Nigeria and their affinities.

 
Volta–Niger languages